Tissa Wewa, an artificial reservoir, was built by Devanampiya Tissa (3rd century BC) in order to increase the water supply to his capital city of Anuradhapura. Only Panda Wewa (5th century BC) and Abhaya Wewa (5th-4th century BC) are older.

Among other uses, the reservoir supplied water to Tissa's Royal Gardens. In later centuries, Tissa Wewa and the other lakes were enlarged and integrated into a regional network of irrigation canals.

References 

Reservoirs in Sri Lanka
Anuradhapura
Lakes of Sri Lanka